Natasha Shangwe Olson-Thorne (born 6 October 1992) is a Hong Kong rugby union player. She represented Hong Kong at the 2017 Women's Rugby World Cup in Ireland, Hong Kong's first World Cup appearance. Olson-Thorne created history when she scored Hong Kong's first World Cup try in their match against Wales.

Biography 
Olson-Thorne began playing rugby at the age of 15 while attending Sha Tin College. She made her international debut for the Hong Kong women's national rugby union team in 2010. She then made her sevens debut at the 2011 Hong Kong Women's Sevens.  

In 2015 she graduated from the University of Hong Kong with a Bachelor of Science in Exercise and Health. She captained the sevens team for the first time at the 2016 Hong Kong Women's Sevens, it was her sixth appearance at the tournament. Olson-Thorne was also in the sevens team vying for a spot at the 2016 Summer Olympics via a repechage tournament in Dublin. She was in the 2021 sevens squad that 'narrowly' missed their chance on qualifying for the 2020 Tokyo Olympics.

She co-captained the Hong Kong sevens team at the 2021 Asia Women's Sevens Series, it was a qualifier event for the 2022 Rugby World Cup Sevens. However, they lost to Japan in the semifinal and missed their chance.

Olson-Thorne was named in the fifteens squad that played in a two-test series against Kazakhstan in December 2022.

References 

1992 births
Living people
Hong Kong people
Hong Kong rugby union players
Hong Kong female rugby union players
Hong Kong female rugby sevens players
Rugby union players at the 2018 Asian Games